33 Squadron or 33rd Squadron may refer to:

 No. 33 Squadron RAAF, a unit of the Australian Royal Air Force
 No. 33 Squadron (Finland), a unit of the Finnish Air Force
 No. 33 Squadron RAF, a unit of the United Kingdom Royal Air Force
 No. 33 Squadron IAF, a unit of the Indian Air Force
 33d Flying Training Squadron, a unit of the United States Air Force
 33 Squadron (Portugal), a unit of the Portuguese Air Force
 VF-33 (Fighter Squadron 33), a disestablished unit of the United States Navy

See also
 33rd Division (disambiguation)
 33rd Brigade (disambiguation)
 33rd Regiment (disambiguation)